The Ornain is a 116 km long river in northeastern France, right tributary of the Saulx (Seine basin). It is formed near the village Gondrecourt-le-Château by the confluence of the small rivers Ognon and Maldite. It flows generally northwest. Its course crosses the following départements and towns:

Meuse: Gondrecourt-le-Château, Ligny-en-Barrois, Bar-le-Duc, Revigny-sur-Ornain
Marne

The Ornain flows into the Saulx in Pargny-sur-Saulx. The part of the Marne-Rhine Canal between Demange-aux-Eaux and Sermaize-les-Bains runs parallel to the Ornain.

References

Rivers of France
Rivers of Grand Est
Rivers of Marne (department)
Rivers of Meuse (department)